Karen Abrahamyan (Armenian: Կարեն_Աբրահամյան; born 4 December 1966) is a politician and general, who is the former Minister of Defence of Artsakh.

Biography 
He was born in the village of Khcaberd of the Hadrut Province of the Azerbaijan SSR. It was there where he attended the M. Manvelyan Secondary School, of which he graduated from in 1984. In the 6 years after he graduated, he studied at the Institute of National Economy of Armenia with a major in economics. From 1990 to 1992, Abrahamyan worked in Hadrut's Savings Bank as a crediting instructor, chief accountant and then Savings Bank's manager. In the mid-1990s, he began to become more involved in the activities of the newly formed defense army in the Nagorno-Karabakh Republic. During this time, he had assumed various military positions, such as platoon commander, deputy commander, and a chief of staff a regiment. In 1998, entered the Russian Defense Ministry’s Military University and graduated with honours. Once he returned to Armenia in 2001, he spent the next 15 years rising through ranks while serving in essential military positions in the Armenian Armed Forces. In December 2018, by decree of the President Bako Sahakyan, Abrahamyan, who was the military chief of staff at the time, was appointed as the defense minister and commander of the defense army, just 10 days after his 52nd birthday. He was dismissed in February 2020.

References 

1965 births
Living people
Artsakh military personnel
Defence ministers of the Republic of Artsakh